The Corners, California may refer to:
The Corners, former name of Buena Vista, Amador County, California
The Corners, former name of Boonville, California